Pallavaram taluk is a taluk in Greater Chennai City formed from the bifurcation of Alandur taluk in 2015. It also included some areas from Sriperumbudur Taluk. Its headquarters are in the town of Pallavaram near Pallavaram–Thuraipakkam Radial Road. It comes under Chennai Metropolitan Development Authority (CMDA). It shares its boundaries with Alandur Taluk in Chennai District on the north, Kundrathur Taluk in Kanchipuram district on the west, Sholinganallur Taluk in Chennai District on the east.

Later in 2018, Areas under Alandur Taluk (which also comes under Greater Chennai Corporation) were annexed with Chennai District. Villages that are not under Greater Chennai Corporation in Alandur Taluk are moved to Pallavaram Taluk.

Pallavaram Taluk has four revenue blocks: Pallavaram, Pammal, Kundrathur and Mangadu.

Since 2019, new Chengalpattu district has been carved out from Kancheepuram District. Kundrathur is formed as new taluk with Kundrathur and Mangadu revenue blocks. Kundrathur taluk comes under Kancheepuram District and Pallavaram Taluk is moved to newly formed Chengalpattu District.

The total area of Pallavaram is 100 km2 including Kundrathur and Mangadu Firkas forming a largest taluk. Since 2019, Kundrathur and Mangadu Firkas are carved out from Pallavaram Taluk to form the new Kundrathur Taluk under Kancheepuram District. So, the total area of Pallavaram Taluk will shrink to 62 km2 covering Pallavaram and Pammal revenue blocks.

Currently, Pallavaram Taluk will have 2 firkas: Pallavaram and Pammal revenue blocks.
 Pallavaram Firka
 Pammal Firka

Pallavaram taluk will soon have its own District Munsif Court.

Pallavaram Firka 
Tirusulam, Cantonment Pallavaram, St. Thomas Mount Cantonment, Meenambakkam Cantonment, Essa Pallavaram, Zamin Pallavaram, Chromepet, Keelkattalai, Nemilichery, Hasthinapuram and Moovarasampattu villages.

Pammal Firka 
Thiruneermalai, Pammal, Anakaputhur, Pozhichalur and Cowl Bazaar.

Taluk Boundaries

Demographics 
Pallavaram Taluk was created in 2015. The demographics for the taluk will be published based on 2021 Census Report.

Administration
The taluk is administered by the Tahsildar office located in Pallavaram.

References

External links 
 Pallavaram is set to become a taluk The Hindu
 Work on new building for Pallavaram Taluk The New Indian Express
 Taluk boundaries of Tambaram and Pallavaram expanded livechennai.com
 Tamilnadu gets five new districts News Today
 TN gets five new districts, notified in govt gazette United News of India
 Resurrected Chengalpet is now a satellite district Times of India

Taluks of Chengalpattu district
Tamil Nadu